Lai Valley Rural LLG - Kulia 741 is a local-level government (LLG) of Southern Highlands Province, Papua New Guinea.

Wards
01. Topa 
02. Komp
03. Tugup 1
04. Kip 1
05. Kip 2
06. Tumia
07. Munihu Station
08. Maip 1
09. Kuianda
10. Soba 1
11. Soba 2
12. Nol
13. Injet
14. Tubip 2
15. Kema
16. Nengia
17. Imilhoma
18. Wariba
19. Marara
20. Sol
21. Honda
22. Monta
23. Maip 2
24. Soba
25. Mariste
26. Waip
27. Angoma Mariste
28. Sombol
29. Pendia

References

Local-level governments of Southern Highlands Province